John Lewis Morgan (23 October 1892 - 7 July 1947) was a Welsh international forward who played club rugby for Llandovery College and Llanelli. He won two caps for Wales before returning to live in his home country of Argentina. He is the only Wales rugby union player to date born in Patagonia.

Personal history
Morgan was born in Alejandra, Argentina in 1892. He moved to Wales as a child and was educated at Carmarthen Grammar School and later at Llandovery College. He was a talented all-round sportsperson who played as a hooker for the college during the winter and was an important member of the cricket XI during the summer months. After leaving college he found employment as an engineer at the Thomas and Clement Foundry in Llanelli. In 1913 he returned to Argentina where he became a farmer in his birth town of Alejandra. In 192 he moved to Campo Largo where he worked as a police officer. He died in Argentina in 1947.

Rugby career
Morgan is initially recorded playing rugby when he was a student at Llandovery College. On moving to Llanelli he joined local side the Oriental Stars, where he was soon spotted by Llanelli RFC and given a place in their team. While at Llanelli Morgan faced his first international opponents, selected for his club against the second touring South Africans. It was a close match with the tourists winning 8-7. Morgan did enough to impress and was selected for his first international cap for Wales, facing the same South African team. In another tough match Morgan again found himself on the losing side this time the result was 3-0. Morgan played one last match for his adopted country when he faced England in the 1913 Five Nations Championship.

International matches played
Wales
  1912
  1913

References

Bibliography
 
 
 

Welsh rugby union players
Argentine rugby union players
Rugby union flankers
1892 births
1947 deaths
Llanelli RFC players
People educated at Llandovery College
Wales international rugby union players
Argentine emigrants to the United Kingdom